Ferdinand Kolarik (4 October 1937 – 6 January 2021) was an Austrian footballer. He played in two matches for the Austria national football team in 1963.

References

External links
 

1937 births
2021 deaths
Austrian footballers
Austria international footballers
Place of birth missing
Association footballers not categorized by position